The Samcheok Railway (Japanese: 三陟鐵道株式會社, Sanchoku Tetsudō Kabushiki Kaisha; Korean: 삼척철도주식회사, Samcheok Cheoldo Jusikhoesa), was a privately owned railway company in Japanese-occupied Korea.

The first  section of the line (Mukho Port–Dogye) was opened on 31 July 1940.  The line was named Cheoram Line, which ran from Mukho, a port on Korea's east coast that became part of Donghae in 1980, to Cheoram in the Taebaek Mountains, to develop three coal fields.  Between Simpo-ri and Tong-ri stations, the great height difference was scaled by a steep double-track railway. Freight railcars going up and down were connected to the same cable, passengers had to walk up the mountain. On 1 August 1940, a branch from Bukpyeong (today Donghae Station) to Mukho bypassing Mukho Port was opened, and the original alignment became the Mukho Port Line (ko); this was followed by a  branch from Bukpyeong to Samcheok, the Samcheok Line (ko), that was opened on 11 February 1944.

After the partition of Korea the Samcheok Railway's network was entirely within the territory of South Korea, and the company was nationalised on 10 August 1948 and made part of the Korean National Railroad. The Cheoram Line became part of the KNR's Yeongdong Line in 1963, whilst the Samcheok Line remained a separate line. The Samcheok Railway's network was isolated from the rest of Korea's railways, and remained so until 1955.

Motive Power

Amongst other locomotives, the Samcheok Railway operated two 2-6-2T tank locomotives built by Kisha Seizō of Japan for the railway in 1938; the company designated them the 350 series, numbered 350 and 351.

Network

References

Rail transport in South Korea
Rail transport in Korea
Defunct railway companies of Korea
Korea under Japanese rule
Defunct companies of Japan